Typhoptera is an Asian genus of bush-crickets in the tribe Cymatomerini and the subfamily Pseudophyllinae.  Species are recorded from India, Indo-China and Malesia.

Species
Species include:
Typhoptera obliquevenosa Beier, 1954
Typhoptera pallidemaculata (Brunner von Wattenwyl, 1895)
Typhoptera pfeifferae (Brunner von Wattenwyl, 1895)
Typhoptera quadrituberculata (Westwood, 1848)
Typhoptera siamensis Karny, 1926
Typhoptera staudingeri (Brunner von Wattenwyl, 1895)
Typhoptera unicolor (Brunner von Wattenwyl, 1895)

Note: A binomial authority in parentheses indicates that the species was originally described in a genus other than Typhoptera.

References

External links

Pseudophyllinae
Tettigoniidae genera
Orthoptera of Asia
Orthoptera of Indo-China